On the afternoon of 25 September 2021, a group of anonymous feminists intervened in the Christopher Columbus roundabout on Paseo de la Reforma Avenue, Mexico City. On an empty plinth surrounded by protective fences, they installed a wooden antimonumenta, a guerrilla sculpture that calls for justice for the recurrent acts of violence against women in Mexico. It was originally called , subsequently known as Justicia, and depicts a purple woman holding her left arm raised and the word justice carved into a support on the back.

The traffic circle formerly honored Columbus with a statue sculpted by French artist Charles Cordier, which was installed in 1887. Prior to a 2020 anti-Columbus Day protest, Mexico City's administration, led by mayor Claudia Sheinbaum, removed it from the pedestal under the pretense of restoration. Months later, Sheinbaum announced that the statue would not be returned to its original site and that, following a request from 5,000 indigenous women to decolonize the avenue, a monument would be installed to honor them. The project was named Tlalli and proposed a sculpture created by a non-indigenous male artist who drew inspiration from the existing Olmec colossal heads, all of which depict men. Feminists objected to the proposal because they considered that the sculptor unsuited to honor indigenous women and a few days later they installed their own design on the plinth.

Justicia was not initially intended to be permanent; according to the installers, the city could select the sculpture's design but should rename the traffic circle to their suggested name instead. Since its placement, feminists have organized cultural events at the roundabout to honor all the women who they describe as fighters and men who fight for them and have had their names memorialized on the protective fences, installed a clothesline to denounce the injustices that they have experienced from authorities and society, and replaced the original woodwork with a steel one. Sheinbaum, on the other hand, had commented that the government of the city wanted to officially replace the Monument to Columbus with a replica of The Young Woman of Amajac, a Huastec sculpture, and thus relocate the Vivas Nos Queremos anti-monument to a different place, an action to which feminists are opposed unless their demands are met.

Following months of discussion, in February 2023, Sheinbaum declared that both Justicia and The Young Woman of Amajac will coexist in the traffic circle, while the Columbus sculpture would be relocated to the National Museum of the Viceroyalty, in Tepotzotlán, State of Mexico.

Background

The statue of Christopher Columbus in Paseo de la Reforma, one of two Mexico City monuments dedicated to Christopher Columbus, was removed on 10 October 2020 prior to an attempted demonstration to topple it two days later—on Columbus Day. According to the government of the city, it was removed as part of a series of restorations performed by the National Institute of Anthropology and History (INAH). Mayor Claudia Sheinbaum announced that public discussions on the monument's future would take place in 2021. However, these were not conducted, and the government of the city decided to replace the statue of Columbus with Tlalli, a large female head statue by Pedro Reyes who was inspired by the male Olmec colossal heads and whose intention was to honor 500 years of the resistance of Mexican indigenous women. The city government explained that the removal occurred after receiving 5,000 signatures from indigenous women who asked to "decolonize Paseo de la Reforma".

Tlalli sparked several controversies, including the selection of Reyes, a mestizo male, to represent Mexican indigenous women, or its design and name, which were questioned by academics like researcher Lucía Melgar and Mixe writer . Melgar said that it was an example of how women and indigenous women are seen as "generic, mute and immobilized" while Aguilar questioned the use of a Nahuatl word (which means land or earth) to name a project based on the Mixe–Zoque-speaking Olmec culture. Sheinbaum postponed the installation and declared that a committee would handle the situation as a result of the controversies.

History

Installation and description

They used multiple ropes and the already-existing steel staples fixed with cement to hold it on the pedestal.

The installation occurred as a protest against the recurrent acts of violence against women in Mexico, a country that is commonly ranked among unequal and hostile countries for women, according to reports that include those of the Organisation for Economic Co-operation and Development, the Georgetown University's Women Peace and Security Index 2019/20, or the United Nations Development Programme's Gender Inequality Index. Feminists during the installation requested the formation of an artistic committee with indigenous female members to choose a replacement by consensus and added that they did not want to impose their choice of a statue, saying, "You decide the figure, we have renamed the roundabout". They further explained that their representation was created in honor of all the women who have fought for justice throughout the nation, that is, from "the brave women of independence up to the present day and also those who were killed fighting for justice". As stated by the authors, the project arose after the removal of the statue of Columbus but remained under planning until the announcement of Tlalli. They came to their conclusion with its organization and installation after observing the various errors made by the authorities. Throughout those months, various women's organizations clandestinely planned the placement of the artwork and invited victims and human rights advocates to take part. 

Additionally, while a group installed the Justicia sculpture, another one painted the names of murdered and disappeared women on the protective fences, like that of Marisela Escobedo Ortiz, a woman who was killed while she was protesting the murder of her daughter. Some names include those of living women who, they say, have resisted injustice. In preparation for the action, research was done on  indigenous women, mothers of victims of femicide, historical women, defenders of water, land, life, and women journalists. The city government covered those names with white paint hours later. Sheinbaum said it was a common action, as cleanup groups are authorized to conduct cleanup works after demonstrations in the city. A group of feminists came back the following day on the seventh anniversary of the Iguala mass kidnapping and painted the names once more with the addition, "You will not erase us". During an abortion rights demonstration on 3 October 2021, the names were restored after having been covered again during the week. In addition, the names of men who have fought for women or who have been murdered or disappeared were mentioned and written down.

Events after its installation

On 25 November 2021, the date commemorating the International Day for the Elimination of Violence against Women, feminists installed complaints clotheslines where they clothespinned the names of public officials and of institutions that they considered had not followed up on their complaints or had ignored or minimized them. They also sang a protest song there. The next day, male police officers broke the clotheslines and attempted to remove the protective fences bearing the written names; when they noticed that groups of women were filming them, they repositioned them. On 31 October, a Day of the Dead altar was set up on the main path of the roundabout, where feminists wrote: "México Feminicida" (Mexico Femicidal). They also placed cempasúchil flowers and papel picado sheets with the phrase "Fue el estado" (It was the state) cut into them. 

Also,the Garden of Memory was set up, featuring another clothesline with 300 complaints and whose intention is "bearing the names of historical women [...] who teach us every day with their struggles that dignity has to be customary".

Human rights groups unofficially renamed the Glorieta de Colón and Hamburgo stations of the Mexico City Metrobús as the "Glorieta de las Mujeres Que Luchan" and "Glorieta de las y los Desaparecidos" stations, respectively, on 24 July 2022. The latter was done in honor of the nearby anti-monument of the same name. The signage maintained the style used by the system and the pictograms of the stations were replaced with their protest symbols. A number of events were held at the roundabout on the first anniversary of the Justicia installation, including the installation of a pink cross, the hanging of photos of the missing and murdered, and a dance and song performance. In reiterating their stance on the proposed relocation, the collectives said that the location "not only has to do with the issue of femicide and disappearance but also the various struggles that women have in the country, namely, the indigenous mothers, the struggle for the defense of land [or] water".

Planned removal

On 12 October 2021, the city government announced that it intended to  replace the monument to Columbus with a replica of The Young Woman of Amajac. They also criticized that the artwork that is expected to replace theirs is believed to have been a young elite woman or a ruler. The mother of a murdered teenager said that any alteration would be "an act of direct aggression to the demands of justice". Sheinbaum stated in June 2022 that the replica of The Young Woman of Amajac was almost complete and that she was in talks with feminist collectives to reach an agreement on the relocation of the main sculpture. In response, feminist groups stated that no such talks had taken place as of August 2022 and claimed that the government was only interested in advancing its political agenda, adding that "the state wants to hide the fact that 11 to 13 women are murdered each day [and] that more than 30 people disappear each day".

City officials met with representatives of various human rights groups in November 2022 to reach a consensus on the future of the traffic circle. Ricardo Ruiz, Undersecretary of Government, assured that although the requests of the groups are respected, there cannot be an imposition by any party and that the space must be public. Ingrid Gómez Saracíbar, Secretary of Women, proposed a common agreement to generate a space for coexistence. She added that The Young Woman of Amajac does not arise from the wishes of indigenous women but rather from an electoral intention on the part of Sheinbaum's team and requested that, before seeking to place a symbol in the name of indigenous people, they should first apologize for the crimes committed against indigenous peoples by the country's governments. At the event, a letter written by Otomi women was read, requesting that—instead of replacing the anti-monument in Reforma—the city government replace another statue honoring Columbus in the city (Manuel Vilar, 1892) with the sculpture of The Young Woman of Amajac, as they considered that Paseo de la Reforma had already been decolonized.

Following months of discussion, in February 2023, Sheinbaum announced that both Justicia and The Young Woman of Amajac will coexist in the traffic circle, while the Columbus sculpture would be relocated to the National Museum of the Viceroyalty, in Tepotzotlán, State of Mexico. About it, Sheinbaum added, "We do it because we women have been silenced for a long time [...] And those who have been silenced the most are the indigenous women". Days later, during a speech in Morelia, Michoacán, Sheinbaum said that there were "deeply racist and classist" women who opposed the installation of The Young Woman of Amajac. The following day, when confronted by feminists and human rights groups, Sheinbaum said that she was not referring to these groups in that context.

On 7 March 2023, dozens of collective groups published through Amnesty International an open letter addressed to Sheinbaum. In it, the collectives mentioned that they "were very concerned that the Mexico City government does not recognize the value of the social mobilization of thousands of women [...] who have been and are fundamental for the human rights of all women to be recognized, guaranteed, protected, promoted and respected".

Reception
Author Sabrina Melenotte noted that the installation roughly "links art, memory and public space" and raises questions on "the role and the legitimate place of artistic and social expressions that serve as monuments". David Pérez wrote for Milenio that the set of protest acts located in the  serve to reflect on the recurring episodes of violence and that it serves as a medium that highlights the meaning that is given to the use of memory in response to violence. Carmen Contreras, consultant in gendered urban development, mentioned that the installation follows the line of interventions in the urban space that show that the actions of public institutions do not work and that a change is required to avoid discrimination among citizens in order to achieve justice. 

Diana Murrieta, founder of the feminist group Nosotras Para Ellas, wrote in an opinion column in the El Heraldo de México newspaper that the appropriation of public spaces is important to let the women of the country know that equality is achievable as long as actions are performed collectively. Ayahuitl Estrada, founder of the feminist collective Restauradoras con Glitter, said that with such acts feminist women are "changing the discourse imposed by the state of what the representation of vulnerable women should be". In her column for Voces México, art critic  commented negatively on the artwork and its installation, saying that such actions harm feminism, which society calls unjustified, radical and violent, and asked feminists not to speak for all women because she interprets the appropriation as an act of "ideological, populist arrogance, supported by the propaganda of [social] networks". Regarding the Vivas Nos Queremos anti-monument, she called it an "aesthetic eyesore" that denigrates women in history and demeans them to a symbol similar to the pictogram indicating the women's restroom.

According to Gantús, this posture only seeks to support the president of Mexico and former leader of their party, Andrés Manuel López Obrador. Scholar Lucía Melgar commented that if Sheinbaum would stop "wallowing in imaginary achievements, repeating empty speeches, and inventing a courtly 'people'" she could learn to respect the space that feminists chose to protest against violence. In her opinion column in SDP Noticias, Claudia Santillana Rivera recommended that Sheinbaum pay attention to the installation because women would not necessarily vote for her if she were the candidate in the 2024 Mexican general election, especially if she does not show interest in resolving the problems experienced by women in the nation.

Gallery

See also

 2021 in art
 Antimonumenta (Mexico City), another work in the city
 Feminist art

References

Further reading

External links
 

2021 establishments in Mexico
2021 in Mexico
Anti-monuments in Mexico
Feminist art
History of women in Mexico
Monuments and memorials in Mexico City
Monuments and memorials to women
Outdoor sculptures in Mexico City
Paseo de la Reforma
Roundabouts and traffic circles in Mexico
Sculptures of women in Mexico
Statues in Mexico City
Steel sculptures in Mexico
Women in Mexico City
Wooden sculptures